United States Coast Guard Base Cape Cod is a United States Coast Guard base located in Sandwich, Massachusetts. It was founded in August 2014 as the single point for Deputy Commandant for Mission Support for the United States Coast Guard First District.

See also
List of military installations in Massachusetts

References

United States Coast Guard stations
Sandwich, Massachusetts
Military installations in Massachusetts
Military installations established in 2014
2014 establishments in Massachusetts